Notonecta unifasciata is a species of backswimmer in the family Notonectidae. It is found in Central America, North America, and South America.

Subspecies
These three subspecies belong to the species Notonecta unifasciata:
 Notonecta unifasciata andersoni Hungerford, 1934
 Notonecta unifasciata cochisiana Hungerford, 1934
 Notonecta unifasciata unifasciata Guérin-Méneville, 1857

References

Notonecta
Articles created by Qbugbot
Insects described in 1857